"The Medicine Men" is the ninth episode of the third series of the 1960s cult British spy-fi television series The Avengers, starring Patrick Macnee and Honor Blackman. It was first broadcast by ABC on 23 November 1963. The episode was directed by Kim Mills and written by Malcolm Hulke.

Plot
Steed and Cathy investigate a conspiracy to flood the market with counterfeit medicines.

Cast
 Patrick Macnee as John Steed
 Honor Blackman as Cathy Gale 
 Peter Barkworth as Geoffrey Willis 
 Newton Blick as John Willis 
 Harold Innocent as Frank Leeson 
 Joy Wood as Miss Dowell 
 Monica Stevenson as Fay 
 John Crocker as Taylor 
 Peter Hughes as Edwards 
 Brenda Cowling as Masseuse

References

External links

Episode overview on The Avengers Forever! website

The Avengers (season 3) episodes
1963 British television episodes